Paweł Antoni Arndt (born 21 January 1954 in Gniezno) is a Polish politician. He was elected to the Sejm on 25 September 2005 getting 6546 votes in 37 Konin district, campaigning on the Civic Platform list.

He was also a member of Sejm 1997-2001.

See also
Members of Polish Sejm 2005-2007

External links
Paweł Arndt - parliamentary page - includes declarations of interest, voting record, and transcripts of speeches.

1954 births
Civic Platform politicians
Living people
People from Gniezno
Polish people of German descent
Members of the Polish Sejm 1997–2001
Members of the Polish Sejm 2005–2007
Members of the Polish Sejm 2007–2011
Members of the Polish Sejm 2011–2015
Members of the Polish Sejm 2015–2019
Members of the Senate of Poland 2019–2023
Poznań University of Technology alumni